Ascension Providence (formerly Providence Hospital) is a 349-bed high-rise hospital in the U.S. city of Mobile, Alabama. The hospital tower was completed in 1987. It was designed by noted American architect Bertrand Goldberg, best known for the Marina City complex in Chicago.

History
Providence Hospital was founded in 1854 by the Daughters of Charity from Emmitsburg, Maryland.  Mobile's first bishop, Michael Portier, had asked the first four Sisters to come to Mobile in 1841 to care for orphans, following an outbreak of yellow fever.  By 1852 the Sisters were under contract to administer the City Hospital of Mobile.  This ended in 1854 when they resigned from the hospital.  Their resignation came during a period of high anti-Catholic sentiment in the city, provoked by the local Know Nothing political movement.  A board of local citizens was formed on August 15, 1854 to build a new hospital for the Sisters.  They completed a new 60-bed hospital in 1855 at the intersection of Broad and St. Anthony Streets.

In 1902 the facility moved to a new Mediterranean Revival structure on an  Springhill Avenue campus.  In 1904 they founded the second school of nursing to be established in Alabama.  By the late 1940s the old 100-bed structure had been outgrown and a new building, in front of the old, was started in February 1949.  The new 250-bed Modern-style structure was completed by October 1952.

That structure was also outgrown by the 1980s.  The Sisters decided to move the hospital to a  site on the western boundary of the city.  Bertrand Goldberg, known for his innovative hospital designs, was hired to design the new $60-million facility.  It would be one of the last major hospital complexes designed by his firm.  By this time Goldberg had completed a number of other healthcare facilities and had refined his innovative "bed-cluster pod."  The pod, with its groups of rooms encircling a central nurse's station, increased the ability of nurses to see and access patients easily.  Construction on the reinforced concrete high-rise structure began in 1982 and accepted its first patients on July 15, 1987.

See also
List of tallest buildings in Mobile

References

External links
 Ascension Providence (Official website)

Skyscrapers in Mobile, Alabama
Hospitals in Alabama
Bertrand Goldberg buildings
Catholic hospitals in North America
1854 establishments in Alabama
Hospital buildings completed in 1902
Hospital buildings completed in 1952
Hospital buildings completed in 1987
Skyscrapers in Alabama